Patrick "Pat" King (1947 – 13 April 2015) was an Irish Gaelic footballer who played as a full-back at senior level for the Tyrone county team.

Born in Trillick, County Tyrone, King first played competitive Gaelic football in his youth. He played inter-county football as a member of the Tyrone senior team in the 1970s. During his career he won one Ulster Senior Football Championship medal.

As a member of the Ulster inter-provincial team on a number of occasions, King won one Railway Cup medal. At club level he was a five-time Tyrone Senior Football Championship medallist with Trillick St Macartan's and won one senior championship medal with Lisnaskea.

In retirement from playing, King became involved in team management and coaching. At club level he served as manager of the Lisnaskea senior team while he also took charge of the Fermanagh senior team.

References

1947 births
2015 deaths
Gaelic football managers
Trillick St Macartan's Gaelic footballers
Tyrone inter-county Gaelic footballers